Surugiu, meaning "charioteer"si, is a Romanian surname. Notable people with the surname include:

Florin Surugiu (born 1984), Romanian rugby union player
Olivian Surugiu (born 1990), Romanian professional footballer

Romanian-language surnames
Occupational surnames